Taxand is a global organisation of tax advisory firms.

Taxand provides audit free, conflict free, partner led, integrated international tax advice. Each firm in each country is a separate and independent legal entity.

Taxand has over 2000 tax advisers from over 40 countries.

References

External links 
 Taxand Global Website

Accounting organizations
Organizations established in 2005